Ihmissokkelo (translation: Human maze) is the eleventh studio album by the Finnish thrash metal band Mokoma. The album was released through Sakara Records on February 21, 2020, and was produced by Janne Saksa and mixed by Jens Borgen. The album peaked on the top position of the Official Finnish Charts.

Track listing

Personnel
 Kuisma Aalto – guitar, backing vocals
 Marko Annala – vocals
 Janne Hyrkäs – drums
 Santtu Hämäläinen – bass
 Tuomo Saikkonen – guitar, backing vocals

References 

2020 albums
Mokoma albums